Chris Bos is a Republican member of the Illinois House of Representatives for the 51st district until January 2023. The 51st district, located in the Chicago area, includes all or parts of Arlington Heights, Barrington, Barrington Hills, Buffalo Grove, Deer Park, Forest Lake, Grayslake, Green Oaks, Gurnee, Hawthorn Woods, Kildeer, Lake Barrington, Lake Zurich, Libertyville, Long Grove, Mettawa, Mundelein, North Barrington, Tower Lakes, Vernon Hills, Wauconda, and Waukegan.

In the 2020 general election, Bos defeated the Democratic incumbent Mary Edly-Allen. In the 2022 midterm elections, Bos was defeated by Democratic challenger Nabeela Syed.

As of July 3, 2022, Representative Bos is a member of the following Illinois House committees:

 Adoption & Child Welfare Committee (HACW)
 Appropriations - Public Safety Committee (HAPP)
 Housing Committee (SHOU)
 Judiciary - Criminal Committee (HJUC)
 Mental Health & Addiction Committee (HMEH)
 Police & Fire Committee (SHPF)

Electoral history

References

External links
 Representative Chris Bos (R) at the Illinois General Assembly website
 Official campaign website

Republican Party members of the Illinois House of Representatives
People from Lake Zurich, Illinois
Living people
1978 births